Felix Ruvimovich Gantmacher (23 February 1908 – 16 May 1964) was a Soviet mathematician, professor at Moscow Institute of Physics and Technology, well known for his contributions in mechanics, linear algebra and Lie group theory. In 1925–1926 he participated in seminar guided by Nikolai Chebotaryov in Odessa and wrote his first research paper in 1926.

His book Theory of Matrices (1953) is a standard reference of linear algebra. It has been translated into various languages including a two-volume version in English prepared by Joel Lee Brenner, Donald W. Bushaw, and S. Evanusa. George Herbert Weiss noted that "this book cannot be recommended too highly as it contains material otherwise unavailable in book form".

Gantmacher collaborated with Mark Krein on Oscillation Matrices and Kernels and Small Vibrations of Mechanical Systems.

In 1939 he contributed to the classification problem of the real Lie algebras.

In the same year he wrote on automorphisms of complex Lie groups.

His son Vsevolod Gantmacher is a noted physicist.

Publication

Notes 

1908 births
1964 deaths
Scientists from Odesa
Soviet mathematicians
Academic staff of the Moscow Institute of Physics and Technology
Stalin Prize winners
Ukrainian Jews
Odesa Jews
Central Aerohydrodynamic Institute employees
K. D. Ushinsky South Ukrainian National Pedagogical University alumni
Academic staff of K. D. Ushinsky South Ukrainian National Pedagogical University